Britt Lafforgue (born 5 November 1948) is a French former alpine skier who competed in the 1972 Winter Olympics.

External links
 sports-reference.com
 

1948 births
Living people
French female alpine skiers
Olympic alpine skiers of France
FIS Alpine Ski World Cup champions
Alpine skiers at the 1972 Winter Olympics
20th-century French women